Strychnos chromatoxylon is a species of plant in the Loganiaceae family. It is found in Cameroon, Central African Republic, and Ivory Coast.

References

chromatoxylon
Data deficient plants
Taxonomy articles created by Polbot